A Scientist in Wonderland: A Memoir of Searching for Truth and Finding Trouble is an autobiography by Edzard Ernst. Ernst writes about being a homeopathic patient in childhood and, later, a homeopathic practitioner. His doubts about the practice eventually lead him to reject it, and he becomes an outspoken critic of the alternative modality.

References

External links
 A Scientist in Wonderland in Science-Based Medicine
 A Scientist in Wonderland: A Memoir of Searching for Truth and Finding Trouble reviewed by Publishers Weekly

Books about health care
Literature about homeopathy
Science autobiographies
2015 non-fiction books